U.S. Folgore Caratese A.S.D. is an Italian association football club, based in Carate Brianza which currently plays in Serie D group A.

History 

The club was founded in 2011 after the merger of U.S. Folgore Verano (founded in 1951 and playing in Eccellenza) and U.S. Caratese (founded in 1908 and playing in Serie D). The most notable former player of Caratese has been Moreno Torricelli.

Folgore Caratese was formerly a satellite team of Novara Calcio. The club serves as a training side for Novara's young talents.

Folgore Caratese was chaired from 2016 to 2022 by journalist Michele Criscitiello, who is also editor-in-chief and co-owner of sports TV channel Sportitalia, the latter serving also as the official club sponsor during the period.

Colors and badge 
The team's colors are blue with white border.

Stadium 
It plays at the Stadio XXV Aprile in Carate Brianza, which has a capacity of 3,000.

References

External links 
  Official Website 

Football clubs in Lombardy
Association football clubs established in 2011
2011 establishments in Italy